The grey-fronted green pigeon (Treron affinis) is a pigeon in the genus Treron. It is found in the forests of the Western Ghats in India. Many authorities have split the species from the pompadour green pigeon complex.

Description
The male has a reddish mantle. The female has a green mantle.

Behaviour
The grey-fronted green pigeon usually occurs singly or in small groups. Its flight is fast and direct, with the regular beats and an occasional sharp flick of the wings that are characteristic of pigeons in general. It eats the seeds and fruits of a wide variety of plants.  It builds a stick nest in a tree and lays two white eggs.

Gallery

References

External links
Collar, N.J. 2011. Species limits in some Philippine birds including the Greater Flameback Chrysocolaptes lucidus. Forktail number 27: 29–38.
Rasmussen, P.C., and J.C. Anderton. 2005. Birds of South Asia: the Ripley guide. Lynx Edicions and Smithsonian Institution.

grey-fronted green pigeon
Birds of South India
grey-fronted green pigeon